"Strange Bedfellows" is the 263rd episode of the American television series, ER. The episode aired on March 30, 2006 on NBC.

Plot
Police bring two teenagers, victims of a car crash, into the Hospital Emergency Room. The boy is combative and physically retained and the girl unconscious. The police believer the car stolen and the girl abducted. The boy says nothing, his jaw was broken during a scuffle with the police, and his toxicology screen comes back clean and his altered state the police believe may be from a concussion. Ray notices that the boy is signing, he is deaf, so the restraints are removed.

Sam starts work at her new job with Elliot and decides waking up in a mansion with a housekeeper is not so bad. When she gets a chauffeur driven car to County the staff's interest is piqued. Luka meets up with Alex in the hospital and finds that Sam's son is equally enamoured with their new lifestyle. Sam assures him that they are doing well but when she returns to their new home and finds Elliot refusing her treatment it looks as though things are not going to be as simple working privately as she'd hoped.

Abby finally gets up the nerve to tell Luka that she wants him to stay, citing that even though they have not decided what they are to each other yet she wants him to be there with her for the pregnancy. She blurts all this out unaware that he has already made his decision. Hearing that he is staying a bashful Abby can not help but smile.

Morris is offered a job with a pharmaceutical company by an attractive woman. The prospect of an expense account has him especially intrigued.

Ray Barnett tries to persuade Neela to stay at their apartment but Neela says she's already looking around for somewhere else. Neela meets up with Michael's parents and the trio spend the day in Chicago. Michael's parents bicker the whole time and Neela is often left feeling out of place. Ray gets home with a pizza peace offering but finds Neela just about to walk out of the door. She is going to stay at Abby's place. Ray begs Neela to stay, saying his feelings for her will not get in the way, but her mind is made up and she leaves.

Guest starring
"Staff" 
 Laura Ceron as Nurse Chuny Márquez
 Deezer D as Nurse Malik McGrath
 Abraham Benrubi as Desk Clerk Jerry Markovic
 Troy Evans as Desk Clerk Frank Martin
 Lynn A. Henderson as Paramedic Pamela Olbes
 Michelle Bonilla as Paramedic Christine Harms
Montae Russell as Paramedic Dwight Zadro

"Others"
 Armand Assante as Richard Elliot
 Ernie Hudson as Colonel James Gallant
 Sheryl Lee Ralph as Gloria Gallant
 China Shavers as Olivia Evans
 Dominic Janes as Alex Taggart
 Erin Chambers as Brooke Sawyer
 Taira Soo as Jordan
 Christopher Amitrano as Officer Hollis
 Roderick McCarthy as Officer Owens
 Rocky McMurray as Sergeant Myers

External links
 Full Cast & Crew at the Internet Movie Database

ER (TV series) episodes
2006 American television episodes